Juan Joya Cordero (February 25, 1934 – March 29, 2007) was a Peruvian association football player, recognized as one of Peru's most important strikers. He was a historic forward of the Club Atlético Peñarol of Uruguay in the 1960s, one of the best South American teams of the twentieth century. During his time with Club Atlético Peñarol, he won 6 Uruguayan league championships, two Copa Libertadores, two Intercontinental Cups, and one Intercontinental Champions' Supercup. He was considered one of the best wingers in the world in the 1960s, and remains one of the most famous Peruvian footballers of all time.

Joya also played for Alianza Lima, Juan Aurich and River Plate.

Early life 
Joya was born in Lima, where he started his playing career in the youth team of Alianza Lima. Joya helped the team to win back-to-back titles in 1954 and 1955. In 1958, he scored 17 goals in 18 matches of the Peruvian league, making him the league's top goalscorer.

Playing career
Joya achieved two Peruvian championships with Alianza Lima in 1954 and 1955 and was the top scorer in the Peruvian League in 1957, scoring 17 goals in 18 games. 

In 1960, he joined Club Atlético River Plate. He helped the team reach second place at the Argentina championship.

In 1961, he joined Peñarol, He played 9 seasons as a forward for Club Atlético Peñarol, from 1961 to 1969. With the aurinegro (gold and black) jersey he played 132 games, scoring 80 goals. At Alianza Lima, he had always served as a forward striker, but when he reached Peñarol, coach Roberto Scarone positioned him as a midfielder for the left wing. 

Joya scored two of the five goals that Peñarol scored against Benfica in 1961, winning Peñatol's first Intercontinental Cup. He played four finals of the Copa Libertadores, winning twice, and was the undisputed starter in all of them. While Joya was at Peñarol, the team won 6 Uruguayan league championships (1961, 1962, 1964, 1965, 1967, and 1968), two Copa Libertadores (1961 and 1966), two Intercontinental Cups (1961 and 1966), and one Intercontinental Champions' Supercup (1969). In these tournaments, Joya was a key player, accompanied by Alberto Spencer, Pedro Virgilio Rocha, Julio César Abbadie, and Ermindo Onega. 

While playing for Peñarol, he was nicknamed "Dueño de la Olímpica” (Owner of the Olympic) due to the Tribuna Olímpica (Olympic Grandstand) being the section where he best demonstrated his abilities. He was also given the nickname "negro el once" (Black, #11) by radio commentator Heber Pinto.

In 1970, Joya played for Juan Aurich in Peru.

Joya played 9 games for the Peru national team in which he scored 3 points. He played in two Copa América tournaments in 1957 and 1959. Joya was part of the Peru national team that beat England 4–1 in Lima, a game in which he scored the fourth goal.

Honors

Team

Individual awards
Peruvian League: Top Scorer 1958

References

External links

1934 births
2007 deaths
Footballers from Lima
Association football wingers
Peruvian footballers
Peru international footballers
Club Alianza Lima footballers
Club Atlético River Plate footballers
Peñarol players
Juan Aurich footballers
Peruvian Primera División players
Argentine Primera División players
Uruguayan Primera División players
Expatriate footballers in Argentina
Expatriate footballers in Uruguay
Uruguayan footballers
Uruguay international footballers
Dual internationalists (football)
Copa Libertadores-winning players
Peruvian expatriate footballers
Juan Aurich managers
Peruvian people of African descent